Andrzej Mariusz Trautman (born January 4, 1933 in Warsaw) is a Polish mathematical physicist who has made contributions to classical gravitation in general and to general relativity in particular.

He made contributions to gravitation as early as 1958. The "Trautman-Bondi mass" is named after him.

Biography
Trautman was born in Warsaw, Poland into an artistic family. His father, Mieczysław, was a painter and taught drawing at a secondary school in Warsaw. His mother, Eliza Trautman (née André), was French, though she was born in Spain, where her father, Marius André, was working as a French consular officer. His schooling, at the elementary level, was interrupted by the Warsaw Uprising of 1944. After spending about ten months in Germany, he returned, with his mother (his father had died in 1941) to Poland. In the fall of 1945, they both  went to Paris, to stay with their family there. In  France, Trautman attended a Polish secondary school from which he graduated in 1949 and returned to Poland shortly afterwards.

During the years 1949–55, he studied radio engineering at the Warsaw University of Technology. After earning a master's degree under the influence of Warsaw Tech's theoretical physics professor Jerzy Plebański, he continued graduate work in Leopold Infeld's group at the Institute of Theoretical Physics of University of Warsaw. This Institute was to become his permanent place of study and work. He obtained in 1959 the Ph.D. degree at the Institute of Physics of the Polish Academy of Sciences in Warsaw.

Trautman and Ivor Robinson discovered a family of exact solutions of the Einstein field equation, the Robinson-Trautman gravitational waves.

In 1981, Trautman became a founding member of the World Cultural Council.

References

External links

 

1933 births
Living people
Polish relativity theorists
Warsaw University of Technology alumni
Academic staff of the University of Warsaw
Founding members of the World Cultural Council
Recipients of the State Award Badge (Poland)